The Honorary Consulate of Finland is an extension of Finland's diplomatic activities beyond its standard network of embassies and consulates. The Honorary Consulate appoints private individuals (usually Finns living abroad or people of Finnish descent) to serve as a diplomatic and cultural liaison on a part-time, volunteer basis.

Tasks
Honorary Consuls of Finland:
 Monitor the rights of Finns and Permanent Residents of Finland in the area in which the consulate is located
 Provide guidance and advice for Finnish citizens or Permanent Residents traveling abroad to that area
 Provide some notarized certificates
 Promote economic and cultural relations between Finland and the country in which the honorary consulate is located

Locations in the United States
Honorary Consuls of Finland in the United States can be found in:
 Boston, MA
 Anchorage, AK
 Atlanta GA
 Baltimore, MD
 Birmingham, AL
 Charlotte, NC
 Chicago, IL
 Dallas, TX
 Denver, CO 
 Detroit, MI
 Hancock, MI 
 Honolulu, HI
 Houston, TX
 Lake Worth, FL
 Miami, FL
 Minneapolis, MN
 New Orleans, LA
 Newark, NJ
 Norfolk, VA
 Norwich, CT
 Philadelphia, PA 
 Phoenix, AZ
 Portland, OR 
 Salt Lake City, UT
 San Diego, CA
 San Francisco, CA
 Seattle, WA
 St. Louis, MO
 Virginia, MN

Locations in Sweden
Honorary Consuls of Finland in Sweden can be found in:
 Borlänge
 Karlskoga
 Karlstad
 Västerås

Locations in Canada
Honorary Consuls of Finland in Canada can be found in:
 Toronto, ON
 Vancouver, BC

Past and present Honorary Consuls
 Andy Bingham, Salt Lake City, UT
 Hanna Eklund, Anchorage, AK
 Jon Jurva, Chicago, IL
 Leonard Kopelman, Boston, MA
 Jarl Lindfors, San Francisco, CA
 Pertti Lindfors, San Francisco, CA
 James Kurtti, Hancock, MI

References

Other sources
 
 
 
 

Foreign relations of Finland
Finnish expatriates